Barbara is a station of the Paris Métro on Line 4 in Montrouge and Bagneux. The station was built as part of a two-station southward extension from Mairie de Montrouge to Bagneux–Lucie Aubrac. It opened in January 2022.

History 
The extension of Line 4 south from Mairie de Montrouge received déclaration d'utilité publique in February 2005. Work to built the extension began in 2015, and was originally planned to open in 2020. During the planning stages of the extension, the station was tentatively called Verdun-Sud. Following a public vote, the station was named after French singer Barbara, who was buried in the nearby Cimetière parisien de Bagneux.

The station was opened on 13 January 2022. The extension is expected to bring 37,000 new passengers per day. The cost of the extension was 406 million euro, split between Ile-de-France Region (60%), the state (25.7%), and the department of Hauts-de-Seine, in which Barbara is located (14.3%).

Passenger services

Access
The station has two entrances:
 Access 1 - "Avenue Marx Dormoy" is located along Avenue Marx-Dormoy, at the corner of Avenue de Verdun and Avenue Henri Ginoux. Located on the territory of Montrouge, it is inserted in a building, still under construction (September 2022), which hinders access on the Montrouge side.
 Access 2 - "Avenue de Stalingrad" is located in Bagneux at the corner of Avenue de Stalingrad and Avenue du Colonel-Fabien.

Platform 
The station was designed by LIN (Finn Geipel and Giulia Andi). The vaulted ceiling of the station is covered in white corrugated metal panels. It is fitted with platform edge doors, as part of the automation of Line 4, planned to be completed by 2022. Above the station entrance at Avenue Marx Dormoy, RATP Habitat will build an apartment building for young workers.

Other services
The station connects with lines 128 and 323 of the RATP Bus Network.

Nearby
 Cimetière parisien de Bagneux
 Fort de Montrouge

References

Paris Métro stations in Bagneux
Paris Métro stations in Montrouge
2022 establishments in France
Railway stations in France opened in 2022